Thyestes is an extinct genus of osteostracan agnathan vertebrate of Europe whose fossils are found in Middle to Late Ludlow-aged marine strata of Late Silurian Europe.  Individuals of Thyestes superficially resembled Cephalaspis, but were more closely related to Auchenaspis and Tremataspis.

References 

Osteostraci genera
Silurian fish of Europe